An important question in statistical mechanics is the dependence of model behaviour on the dimension of the system. The shortcut model was introduced in the course of studying this dependence. The model interpolates between discrete regular lattices of integer dimension.

Introduction

The behaviour of different processes on discrete regular lattices have been studied quite extensively. They  show a rich diversity of behaviour, including a non-trivial dependence on the dimension of the regular lattice. In recent years  the study has been extended from regular lattices to complex networks. The shortcut model has been used in studying several processes and their dependence on dimension.

Dimension of complex network

Usually, dimension is defined based on the scaling exponent of some property in the appropriate limit. One property one could use    is the scaling of volume with distance.

For systems which arise in physical problems  one usually can identify some physical space relations among the vertices. Nodes which are linked directly will have more influence on each other than nodes which are separated by several links.

However, the definition which generalises to complex networks is the  norm,

The scaling properties hold for both the Euclidean norm and the  norm. The scaling relation is

where d is not necessarily an integer for complex networks.  is a geometric constant which depends on the complex network. If the scaling relation Eqn.  holds, then one can also define the surface area  as the number of nodes which are exactly at a distance  from a given node, and  scales as

A definition based on the complex network zeta function generalises the definition based on the scaling property of the volume with distance and puts it on a mathematically robust footing.

Shortcut model

The  shortcut model starts with a network built on a one-dimensional regular lattice. One then adds edges to create shortcuts that join remote parts of the lattice to one another. The starting network is a one-dimensional lattice of  vertices with periodic boundary conditions. Each vertex is joined to its neighbors on either side, which results in a system  with  edges. The network is extended by taking each node in turn and, with probability , adding an edge to a new location  nodes distant.

The rewiring process allows the model to interpolate between a one-dimensional regular lattice and a two-dimensional regular lattice. When the rewiring probability , we have a one-dimensional regular lattice of size . The graphs we study are parametrized by

Application to extensiveness of power law potential

One application using the above definition of dimension was to the 

Consider the  Ising model with the Hamiltonian (with N spins)

When the  have the behaviour , we have the power law potential. For a general complex network the condition on the exponent  which preserves extensivity of the Hamiltonian was studied. At zero temperature, the energy per spin is proportional to

and hence extensivity requires that  be finite.  For a general complex network  is proportional to the Riemann zeta function . Thus, for the potential to be extensive, one requires

Other processes which have been studied are self-avoiding random walks, and the scaling of the mean path length with the network size. These studies lead to the interesting result that the dimension transitions sharply as the shortcut probability increases from zero. The sharp transition in the dimension has been explained in terms of the combinatorially large 
number of available paths for points separated by distances large compared to 1.

Conclusion

The shortcut model is useful for studying the dimension dependence of different processes. The processes studied include the behaviour of the power law potential as a function of the dimension, the behaviour of self-avoiding random walks, and the scaling of the mean path length. It may be useful to compare the shortcut model with the small-world network, since the definitions have a lot of similarity. In the small-world network also one starts with a regular lattice and adds shortcuts with probability . However, the shortcuts are not constrained to connect to a node a fixed distance ahead. Instead, the other end of the shortcut can connect to any randomly chosen node. As a result, the small world model tends to a random graph rather than a two-dimensional graph as the shortcut probability is increased.

References

Networks
Statistical mechanics